Babbel GmbH, operating as Babbel, is a German subscription-based language learning software and e-learning platform, available in various languages since January 2008.

History 
Babbel is operated by Babbel GmbH in Berlin, Germany. Babbel has around 450 full-time employees and freelancers. The company is based in the Berlin neighborhood of Mitte.

The company was founded in August 2007 by Thomas Holl, Toine Diepstraten, Lorenz Heine and Markus Witte. In January 2008, the language learning platform went online with community features as a free beta version. In 2008, Kizoo Technology Ventures and IBB Beteiligungsgesellschaft mbH became Babbel's first investors. Then, in 2009, Babbel was granted roughly one million euros by the ERDF European Structural Fund. The new product version, Babbel 2.0, went online in November 2009. At that time Babbel's founders decided against an advertising and mixed-finance model (freemium), opting for paid content.

In March 2013, Babbel acquired San Francisco startup PlaySay Inc. to expand into the United States. As part of the acquisition, PlaySay Founder and CEO Ryan Meinzer joined Babbel as a strategic advisor for its US operations.

In January 2015, Babbel opened an office in New York City with the aim of expanding its presence in the US market. Later that year, a third funding round led by Scottish Equity Partners raised another $22 million. Other participants in this round include previous investors Reed Elsevier Ventures, Nokia Growth Partners, and VC Fonds Technology Berlin. Since January 2017, Babbel, Inc., the company's US subsidiary, has been led by Julie Hansen, CEO U.S.

In November 2018 the company announced it had sold around 1 million subscriptions during the previous year. It was also launching a new set of products, oriented at travel marketplace. The project was going to launch in 2019.

In 2019, co-founder Markus Witte stepped down as CEO and was replaced by Arne Schepker.

In March 2020, a works council was elected that represents the employees of the Berlin office.

In 2021, Babbel launched Babbel Live, offering online tutoring classes to customers.

Concept 
Babbel is a premium, subscription-based language learning app for web, iOS and Android. Babbel currently offers 15 different languages from seven display languages (German, English (US + UK), French, Spanish, Brazilian Portuguese, Italian and Swedish). Babbel's original learning content is developed in-house by a team of over 100 educators and linguists.

There are beginner, intermediate and grammar courses, vocabulary lessons, as well as courses with tongue-twisters, idioms, colloquialisms, and sayings. Courses for a given language may be aimed at a specific audience: for instance, English may be learned as "PR English" or "Marketing English."

In August 2017, Babbel announced that it had partnered with Cambridge English Language Assessment to create a low-cost online English test. The  test assesses beginning and intermediate students' reading and listening skills (up to level B1 and above of the Common European Framework of Reference for Languages). Every test features about 70 questions from a bank of hundreds of options which—like Babbel's lesson content—reflect real-life communicative situations, including recordings of radio broadcasts and conversations for listening tasks.

Juliet Wilson, director of assessment at Cambridge English, explained to Professionals in International Education News that
“...until now it’s been difficult for [online learners] to know whether they are really learning the right skills, or to demonstrate their real level,” going on to say that the Babbel English Test would “give learners reliable evidence of their progress and a certificate of achievement that demonstrates what they have learned.”

Corporate branding and campaigns

Branding 
The word Babbel is derived from the Hebrew verb בָּלַל (bālal), meaning to jumble or to confuse your words.   It is also a pun on the biblical Tower of Babel — a gigantic ziggurat whose construction was interrupted when the workers' languages were made mutually unintelligible by God.  Douglas Adams used the same idea in his Hitchhiker's Guide to the Galaxy to name the Babel fish, a symbiotic fish that serves as a universal translator. Babbel is also a homophone and anagram of the English verb babble.

Campaigns 
Babbel's content marketing arm publishes a digital magazine with written and video content in seven different languages. The topics range from behind-the-scenes looks at how Babbel lessons are created to profiles of Babbel customers and language learning tips from the company's didactics team. In November 2016, Babbel launched a television ad campaign in the UK and Europe. Two television spots were created by the advertising agency Wieden+Kennedy. Sophie Bodoh, Creative Director at Wieden+Kennedy commented, "Everyone has different motivations for learning a language, but we recognised one common truth that applies to every new learner: They have some kind of fantasy about what it will be like to speak a new language confidently. Using the familiar cinematic worlds of different countries, we show Babbel customers playing out their own unique language-speaking fantasies."

Reception 
PC Magazine gave Babbel a mostly positive review, stating it was reasonably priced and well-structured, but more challenging for beginners than similar services.  The New York Times' Ali Watkins described Babbel as "approachable and simple."

Awards 
The language learning platform was one of the finalists for "Best Web Application or Service (EMEA)" in TechCrunch's Europe Awards 2009. In 2011, Babbel was awarded the "Comenius EduMedia Seal" and the "Erasmus EuroMedia Seal of Approval" for "Babbel for Companies“ courses targeted at the business sector.

In 2013, Babbel received the "digital 2013" award and the "Innovate 4 Society" award at CeBIT. In 2016, Fast Company recognized Babbel as the most innovative company in education.

See also
 Duolingo
 Language education
 Computer-assisted language learning
 List of language self-study programs

References

External links 
 Babbel.com

Multilingual websites
Social networking language-learning websites
Internet properties established in 2007
Wikis
German educational websites
Proprietary language learning software
Android (operating system) software